The following highways are numbered 248:

Canada
 Manitoba Provincial Road 248
 Prince Edward Island Route 248
Quebec Route 248

Costa Rica
 National Route 248

India
 National Highway 248 (India)

Japan
 Japan National Route 248

United States
 Alabama State Route 248
 Arkansas Highway 248
 California State Route 248
 Georgia State Route 248 (former)
 K-248 (Kansas highway)
Kentucky Route 248
 Minnesota State Highway 248
 Missouri Route 248
 Montana Secondary Highway 248
 New York State Route 248
 New York State Route 248A
 Ohio State Route 248
 Pennsylvania Route 248
 South Carolina Highway 248
 South Dakota Highway 248
 Tennessee State Route 248
 Texas State Highway 248 (former)
 Texas State Highway Spur 248
 Farm to Market Road 248 (Texas)
 Utah State Route 248